René Arthaud (20 September 1915 - 21 July 2007) was a French politician. He served as a member of the National Assembly from 1946 to 1951, representing Vaucluse. He was also the Minister of Public Health from 24 June 1946 to 16 December 1946.

References

1915 births
2007 deaths
Politicians from Marseille
French Communist Party members
French Ministers of Health
Members of the Constituent Assembly of France (1945)
Members of the Constituent Assembly of France (1946)
Deputies of the 1st National Assembly of the French Fourth Republic